Kepler-68b is an exoplanet orbiting the Sun-like star Kepler-68 in the constellation of Cygnus. Discovered by planetary-transit methods by the Kepler space telescope in February 2013, it has a radius of 2.31 ± 0.07 that of Earth and a density of 2.46–4.3 g/cm3. It has an orbital period of 5.398763 days at a distance of about 0.0617 AU from its star. Doppler measurements were made to determine its mass to be 5.79 times that of Earth (0.026 MJ).

With a density of 2.6 g/cm3 it has physical characteristics of both a super-Earth and a mini-Neptune.

See  also
List of planets discovered by the Kepler spacecraft

References

Exoplanets discovered in 2013
68b
Cygnus (constellation)
Terrestrial planets
Transiting exoplanets